Ricco   is a surname. Notable people with the surname include:

 Carina Ricco, a Mexican actress, singer, musician, producer and composer
 Donna Ricco, an American fashion designer
 John Ricco, an American baseball executive
 Louis Ricco, a longtime member of the Gambino crime family

See also
Ricco (disambiguation)

References

surnames